The Ligue de Hockey Junior du Québec (LHJQ) or Quebec Junior Hockey League (QJHL) is a Hockey Québec Canadian Junior A ice hockey league and is a member of Hockey Canada and the Canadian Junior Hockey League.  The winner of the QJHL playoffs competes for the Fred Page Cup against the winners of the Central Junior A Hockey League and the Maritime Hockey League and the host team, which is on a three-year cycle between the MHL, CJHL and LHJQ.  The winner of the Fred Page Cup then moves on to compete for the Centennial Cup.

History
The Quebec Junior Hockey League is an offshoot of the Quebec Junior A Hockey League that lasted from 1972 to 1982.  Founded in 1988, the QJHL has been a rather strong league, with three Central Canadian Champions (Dudley Hewitt Cup) in its early years: the Longueuil Sieurs in 1990 and the Chateauguay Elites in 1993 and 1994. In 1994–95 they were grouped into the Eastern Canadian region to compete for the Fred Page Cup.  The Joliette Nationals won the first Fred Page Cup in 1995. To this day, the QJHL has four Eastern Canadian titles, the others going to the Joliette Action, Lennoxville Cougars, and St. Jerome Panthers. No Quebec team has ever won the national title despite attending the tournament seven times since 1988.

In 2002–03, Champlain College Lennoxville got a team to play in the LHJAAAQ - Lennoxville Cougars, based on the campus of College Champlain and Bishop's University. The Cougars, who were coached by former NHLer Stéphan Lebeau formed a discipline style of hockey. The method paid off, and Lennoxville captured the Napa Cup as league champions and won the Fred Page Cup. Lennoxville finished the Royal Bank Cup 1–3, the Cougars exited the tournament with semi-finals loss to the Camrose Kodiaks of the AJHL.

In 2003–04, the CJAHL and the LHJAAAQ saw the St-Eustache Gladiateurs ranked #5 overall in Canada. However, the Gladiateurs lost the finals to the Valleyfield Braves. Because Valleyfield was hosting the Fred Page Cup, the Gladiateurs got a berth in the tournament. Saint-Eustache and Valleyfield each held a 2–0 tournament record going into the all-LHJAAAQ match-up that would decide the winner and who gets a bye to the championship finals. Valleyfield won the game 4–0, and Saint-Eustache then lost to the Nepean Raiders 3–2 in double-overtime. The Valleyfield Braves lost the championship game 4–0 to Nepean.

In 2014, 12-year president Richard Morency announced his resignation, but staying on until the transition to the new leadership. The league also announced that it was re-branding itself the Quebec Junior Hockey League (dropping the "AAA" designation) and introduced the corresponding new league logo. The summer also saw the return of the Valleyfield Braves to the League. Owners of the team purchased the LaTuque Wolves, regained rights to the Braves name and logo and brought the team back to the Aréna Salaberry. Another long-time QJHL member, Kahnawake Condors, who were established in 1999 moved to Chambly, Quebec, to be re-branded as the Chambly Forts. Shortly after that move, the Gatineau Mustangs of the Eastern Ontario Junior Hockey League made the jump to the league as the Gatineau Flames, becoming the first Hull-based team since the Aylmer Extreme that had lasted one season in 2000–01. Several weeks after announcing the Gatineau Flames as a member, the Flames purchased the Lachine Maroons and absorbed the franchise rights. The league expelled the Sherbrooke Cougars because the league considered them as a college team and had ties to Bishop's University. The Saint-Hyacinthe Laureats withdrew from the league, possibly in conjunction with the Cougars. The league split into two divisions.

Teams

La Coupe NAPA playoff champions

Former member teams
Kahnawake Condors / Chambly Forts - relocated to Chambly in 2015, folded prior to 2021-2022 season
L'Extreme D'Aylmer - folded after 2000–01 season
Lachine Maroons - 2015 relocate to Gatineau Flames
La Tuque Wolves - renewed Valleyfield Braves franchise
Les Husky de Cowansville - folded after 1999–00 season
Le National de Joliette - ceased operations mid-season (January 2000)
Le Junior Canadiens de Montreal - folded after 1999–00 season
Les Dragons de Saint-Hyacinthe - folded after 1999–00 season
Les Chevaliers de St-Jean - folded after 2001–02 season
Montreal-North Arctic - folded after 2018–19 season. Founded 2002 as the St-Eustache Patriotes. 
Saint-Félicien Multiconcessionnaire - folded after 2008–09 season
Saint-Hyacinthe Lauréats - 2015 withdrew from league
Saint-Lazare Revolution - sold 2019.  Remain in Saint Lazare but re-branded West Island Shamrocks
Sherbrooke Cougars - 2015 expelled from league
 Thetford Mines Filons - relocated to La Tuque Wolves
Valleyfield Braves (defunct) - left league to join LNAH
Vaudreuil-Dorion Mustangs - sold and relocated to Saint-Lazare (2017)

Timeline of teams in the QJHL
1988 - Black Lake Miners play in 1988 Centennial Cup playdowns as Quebec's only Jr. A team
1988 - Quebec Provincial Junior Hockey League is officially founded
1990 - St. Antoine Rapidos join league
1990 - Laval-Bourassa Cobras join league
1991 - St. Antoine Rapidos become Louiseville Jaguars
1991 - Laval-Bourassa Cobras become Montreal-Nord Cobras
1991 - Ste-Marie Beaucerons join league
1992 - Ste-Marie Beaucerons become Loretteville Riverains
1992 - Louisville Jaguars become Saint-Jerome Panthers
1994 - Coaticook Frontaliers join league
1994 - Valleyfield Elites join league
1995 - Lachine Maroons join league
1996 - Warwick Titans join league
1998 - Quebec Provincial Junior Hockey League becomes Quebec Junior AAA Hockey League
1998 - Joliette National cease operations in January 1998
1998 - Valleyfield Elites become Valleyfield Braves
1999 - Kahnawake Condors join league
2000 - Montreal Junior Canadiens fold
2000 - Aylmer Extreme join league and fold after the 2000–01 season
2000 - Cowansville Husky fold
2000 - Saint-Hyacinthe Dragons fold
2002 - Saint-Eustache Gladiateurs join league
2002 - Lennoxville Cougars join league
2003 - Lennoxville Cougars become College Champlain Cougars
2002 - Warwick Titans become College Lefleche Titans
2002 - St-Jean Chevaliers fold
2003 - l’Ile Perrot Mustangs join league
2003 - La Plaine Cobras become Terrebonne Cobras
2004 - St-Lawrence of Quebec Lions join league
2004 - l’Ile Perrot Mustangs become Vaudreuil Mustangs
2005 - Coaticook Frontaliers become Granby Inouk
2006 - Saint-Eustache Gladiateurs become Saint-Eastache Patriotes
2005 - Joliette Action join league
2007 - St-Lawrence of Quebec Lions become Quebec AssurSports
2007 - College Champlain Cougars become Sherbrooke Cougars
2008 - Saint-Eustache Patriotes become Sainte-Therese Nordiques
2008 - Quebec AssurExperts move and become Thetford Mines Filons
2008 - Sainte-Agathe Montagnards join league
2008 - College Lefleche Titans become Princeville Titans
2008 - Saint-Felicien Multiconcessionnaire fold after three seasons
2009 - Sainte-Therese Nordiques become Rousseau-Sports Junior AAA Laval
2009 - Joliette Action become Joliette Traffic
2010 - Thetford Mines Filons become La Tuque Wolves
2010 - Rousseau-Sports Junior AAA Laval become Laval Arctic
2011 - Joliette Traffic become Montreal-Est Rangers
2011 - Laval Arctic become St. Leonard Arctic
2013 - Valleyfield Braves dissolve franchise to seek membership with the Ligue Nord-Americaine de Hockey (LNAH)
2014 - La Toque Wolves relocate to Valleyfield and become the Valleyfield Braves. The ownership reclaims the rights to the Braves name and logo
2014 - League shortens name to Quebec Junior Hockey League
2015 - Kahnawake Condors relocate to Chambly and become Chambly Forts
2015 - Gatineau Flames purchase Lachine Maroons franchise and join league from Eastern Ontario Junior Hockey League
2015 - Sherbrooke Cougars expelled from league
2015 - Saint-Hyacinthe Lauréats withdraw from league
2016 - League returns to the full name of Quebec Junior AAA Hockey League
2017 - Vaudreuil-Dorion Mustangs sold and relocated to St-Lazare Revolution.
2017 - Ste-Agathe Montagnards are sold and relocated to St-Gabriel-de-Brandon
2017 - Côte-du-Sud Everest join league and began play in 2018–19
2018 - St-Léonard Arctic relocates to Montreal-North
2018 - St-Lazare Revolution relocated to Pierrefonds, renamed Lac-St-Louis Revolution
2019 - Lac-St-Louis Revolution renamed as West Island Shamrocks
2019 - Franchise awarded to Cegep de Beauce-Appalaches Condors. The team was set to begin during the 2020-2021 season, but the debut was pushed back to 2021-2022 due to the COVID-19 pandemic
2021 - Chambly Forts fold

References

External links
LHJQ website

 
A
Canadian Junior Hockey League members
A
Hockey Quebec